The 2020–21 Bangladesh Women's Football League, also known as the Tricotex Bangladesh Women's Football League 2020–21 due to sponsorship reason, it was the 4th season of the Bangladesh Women's Football League, the top level of women's football in Bangladesh, since its establishment in 2011. The tournament has started on 31 March. Bashundhara Kings are the defending champions.

The Women's Football League has been postponed indefinitely on 5 April, 2021 as The Bangladesh government has decided to enforce a seven-day lockdown in the country.

Venue
Due to Covid-19 pandemic situation all matches were held at the BSSS Mostafa Kamal Stadium in Dhaka, Bangladesh.

Teams

Clubs and locations
The Bangladesh Football Federation (BFF) have confirmed the following eight participants will contest the league:

Personnel and sponsoring

League table

Results

Positions by round

Goalscorers

 Mst Irin (Nasrin Sporting Club)
 Sumi Khatun (Cumilla United)
 Kursia Jannat (Nasrin Sporting Club)
 Masura Parvin (Bashundhara Kings)
 Sabrina Akter Suma (Kachijhuli Sporting Club)
 Nasrin Akter (Suddopuskorini Jubo SC)
 Shila Akhter (Suddopuskorini Jubo SC)
 Surovi Akhter Eity (Jamalpur Kacharipara Akadas)
 Akhi Khatun (Bashundhara Kings)
 Selina  Khatun (FC Brahmanbaria)
 Kohati Kisku (ARB College Sporting Club)
 Mahfuza Khatun (ARB College Sporting Club)
 Afeida Khandaker (ARB College Sporting Club)
 Soma Akter (Suddopuskorini Jubo SC)
 Sultana Akter (Bashundhara Kings)
 Rojina Akter (Cumilla United)
 Moinu Marma (FC Brahmanbaria)
 Sumi (FC Brahmanbaria)
 Ripa Akter (ARB College Sporting Club)
 Kakoli Akter (ARB College Sporting Club)

Own goals 
† Bold Club indicates winner of the match

Notes

References

2021 in Bangladeshi women's sport
2021 in Bangladeshi football
Women's football in Bangladesh
Bangladesh Women's Football League seasons
Association football events postponed due to the COVID-19 pandemic
2020–21 in Asian association football leagues
2020–21 domestic women's association football leagues